The fifth generation of the BMW 3 Series range of compact executive cars is designated under the model codes E90 (saloon), E91 (estate, marketed as 'Touring'), E92 (coupé) and E93 (convertible). The model was introduced in December 2004, and produced by BMW until October 2013 and is often collectively referred to as the E90 or E9x.

The E9x saw the introduction of run-flat tyres to the 3 Series range. Models with run-flat tires are not equipped with a spare tyre. The E92 335i was the first 3 Series model produced with a turbocharged petrol engine. It was also the first 3 Series to include the iDrive operating system, which consists of navigation, infotainment and essential vehicle functions.

The E90/E92/E93 M3 is the only generation of M3 to be powered by a V8 engine. Introduced in 2007, it uses the BMW S65 naturally aspirated V8 engine and was produced in saloon, coupé and convertible body styles.

Following the introduction of the F30/F31 3 Series in February 2012, the E90/E91 saloons and estates were phased out. However, the E92/E93 coupés and convertibles remained in production through the 2013 model year, after which they were replaced by the F32/F33 4 Series models.

Development and launch 

The design for the fifth generation 3 Series was frozen in mid-2002, approximately 30 months before the start of production. The saloon and estate were designed by Joji Nagashima. Marc Michael Markefka designed the coupé and convertible.

The range was introduced in March 2005 for MY2005 with the saloon and estate body styles. The coupé was introduced in 2006 and the convertible was introduced in 2007, both for MY2007. 

Significant cosmetic and mechanical changes were done to improve the design and performance compared to the previous generation. The E90 series is larger than its predecessor, with a longer wheelbase, wider tracks, and a roomier interior.

Body styles

Saloon (E90) 
The saloon model was the first model sold of the E90/E91/E92/E93 3 series, being launched on 5 March 2005 for the 2006 model year. Production continued until a facelift revision was made for the 2009 model year. Production of the E90 concluded after the 2011 model year, succeeded by the F30 for 2012.

Touring (E91) 
The E91 wagon/estate models were marketed as 'Touring' in Europe and 'Sports Wagon' in North America. Optional equipment included a panoramic sunroof, which extends to the rear passenger area. Trim levels typically were similar to the E90 saloon, however the M3 wasn't produced in the estate body style.

Several markets outside Europe only offered a small subset of models in the estate body style. In the United States and Canada, the only estate model available prior to 2007 was the 325xi, and then the 328i and 328xi from 2007 onwards.

Coupé (E92) 
In July 2006, one year after the saloon was introduced, the E92 coupé body style was unveiled.

Compared with previous generations of the 3 Series, the coupé has more external styling differences to the saloon models. These include the tail-light design (L-shaped on the coupe), more steeply angled headlights and smaller side windows. As per its E46 predecessor, the doors of the coupe are longer and have frameless door windows, the rear seat holds two passengers (compared with a three-person bench for the saloon) with a rear centre console tray and the front seatbelts are on motorised arms that extend from the B-pillar to hand the seatbelts to the driver and/or passenger.

The E92 was the last generation to include coupé (and convertible) body styles as a part of the 3 Series range. For later generations, these body styles are marketed as the 4 Series. Despite the E90/E91 being phased out for the F30/F31 after the 2011 model year, the E92/E93 continued through the 2013 model year. It was then succeeded by the F32/F33 for the 2014 model year.

Convertible (E93) 

The E93 convertible was BMW's first model to use a retractable hardtop (folding metal roof), instead of the cloth roof as previously used. The E93 was one of first retractable hardtops in its price range. The "Comfort Access" option allows the roof to be raised and lowered using the key fob. The E93's side windows are 30 percent larger than its E46 convertible predecessor, resulting in a 38 percent increase in visibility.

The BMW 3 Series convertible was often priced higher than direct rivals, however reviewers have praised its passenger/boot space (even with the roof down), driving dynamics, weight and chassis rigidity.

Engines

Petrol 
Official specifications are as follows:

Since the following generation of 3 Series used turbocharged engines for the entire model range, the E90/E91/E92/E93 was the last 3 Series to be available with naturally aspirated engines.

In North American, Australian and Malaysian markets the N53 was not used, Instead the entire model range continued to use its predecessor, the N52 engine.

In some areas of the United States, the 328i was powered by the BMW N51 straight-six engine and sold as a SULEV model.

In some parts of the world, 4-cylinder models continued to use the N46 engine as the local fuel quality is incompatible with the N43 engine.

Diesel

Suspension 
At the front, MacPherson struts with an aluminum hub carrier and aluminum dual lower links forming a virtual pivot point are used. This design  was previously used on all 5, 7 and 8 series BMW models.

The rear suspension is a 5-link Multi-link suspension, with fabricated steel subframe, fabricated steel control arms, and cast iron carrier. This design is designated "HA 5" by BMW.

Wheels 
The BMW E90+ has a 5x120 bolt pattern with wheel sizes ranging from 16 inch to 20 inch in diameter. There have been 49 original wheel styles produced for this model.

Equipment 

Optional features (some of which are standard on higher models) include Xenon headlamps, automatic climate control, parking sensors, power-adjustable seats, satellite navigation, glass sunroof, heated front seats, Bluetooth and USB audio input.

Optional equipment could be ordered individually or combined into packages. Optional interior colours, known as BMW Individual, were also available at extra cost.

The contents of the 'Premium Package' varied according to model year and market. It included items such as leather seats with power adjustments, memory seat function, lumbar support, auto-dimming mirrors, a digital compass, auto-folding exterior mirrors, BMW Assist w/Bluetooth, and universal garage opener.

The 'Cold Weather Package' includes headlight washers, heated front seats and split/folding rear seats with a ski bag.

The 'Technology Package' includes iDrive, navigation, keyless entry ("Comfort Access"), selectable driving modes ("M Drive"), HD radio and Electronic Damping Control.

M3 model 

The M3 model was powered by the BMW S65 V8 engine and produced in saloon, coupe and convertible body styles.

Alpina models 

The Alpina B3 and D3 models were based on the E90/E91/E92/E93. The B3 was powered by turbocharged 6-cylinder petrol engine and the D3 was powered by a turbocharged 4-cylinder diesel engine.

Special Editions

320si 
To satisfy homologation requirements for the FIA World Touring Car Championship (WTCC), BMW built 2600 units of the 320si. The car featured N45 (N45B20S) engine producing , 24bhp more than the regular 320i. It also featured revised suspension and 20% lower front bumper.

335is 

The 335is was produced in coupé and convertible models for the North American market. Its position in the model lineup was between the regular 335i and the M3, and approximately 4,500 units were produced.

Transmission options were a 7-speed double clutch transmission (DCT) with launch control or a 6-speed manual transmission. The manual transmission has an upgraded clutch compared to the regular 335i.

Other changes compared to the 335i include stiffer engine mounts, a higher-flow exhaust system, an upgraded cooling system, a different steering wheel, sport seats and "335is" badging on dash and in the instrument cluster. Exterior differences are larger air openings in the front bumper, a rear bumper that incorporates a diffuser-style piece, black kidney grills, and 18-inch or 19-inch "Style 313" wheels.

Model year changes

2008 Facelift (LCI) 
In September 2008, the facelift (LCI) versions of the saloon and estate were released for the 2009 model year. Compared to typically subtle BMW LCI changes, these changes were relatively extensive.

Styling changes included front and rear bumpers, wing mirrors, headlights, taillights, boot lid, wider kidney grilles and revised crease lines for the bonnet.
The new 2009 – 2011 facelift (LCI) AWD models became known as "xDrive" models, unlike the previous 2006–2008 (pre-lci) AWD models, which were labeled as "xi" models. The new xDrive models received xDrive badges on the bumper and both the right and left sides right below the side marker lamps. 
For the interior, crash-activated head restraints were added to the front seats, the optional "Professional" navigation system was updated, iDrive was updated and the resolution of the display was increased.

2010 
For the 2010 model year, the Sport, Lifestyle and Exclusive Edition were introduced for saloon and estate models. The 316d estate model was added, as was the 320d EfficientDynamics Edition saloon.

Mechanical changes included compliance with the EU5 emission standard, EU6 emission compliance (optional) for the 320d and 330d models, power increases for the 318d, 320d, 325d and 330d models, the N54 engine in the 335i being replaced by N55 engine, and additional features for BMW ConnectedDrive.

Safety 

The Euro NCAP noted the poor pedestrian protection awarding 4 points out of 36, reporting the 3 Series was "very disappointing" in this measure.

IIHS 
The Insurance Institute for Highway Safety (IIHS) gives the 3 Series a "Good" overall rating in both the frontal and side impact crash tests. The 3 Series received "Good" marks in all six of the frontal crash test categories, and "Good" marks in six of the nine categories in the side impact test. The IIHS also gave the 3 Series the Top Safety Pick award. The convertible is rated "Marginal" in side impacts, making the 3 Series convertible the lowest rated vehicle currently sold in its class in IIHS tests.

Recalls
In November 2017, BMW recalled 672,000 3 Series cars from model years 2006–11 with climate control system electronic components at risk of overheating, due to faulty blower motor wiring.

Production 

In 2002, Norbert Reithofer and Development Chief Burkhard Goeschel started an initiative to halve the time it took to reach full production of the next generation 3 Series from six months to three.

The E90 was produced in Germany (Leipzig, Munich and Regensburg) and in South Africa (Rosslyn). Local assembly of complete knock-down (CKD) kits was used for cars sold in China, Egypt, India, Indonesia, Malaysia, Mexico, Thailand and Russia.

The production dates for each body style are as follows:
 Saloon (E90): December 2004 – October 2011
 Estate (E91): September 2005 – May 2012
 Coupé (E92): June 2006 – June 2013
 Convertible (E93): December 2006 – October 2013

Sales 
First marketed in March 2005, the car quickly became BMW Group's best-selling car worldwide, and by the end of the year 229,900 vehicles had been delivered.

The BMW E90 series was the best-selling luxury car in Canada and the United States. The 2006 E90 marked the 15th consecutive year that the 3 Series was named on Car and Driver's 10Best.

Units sold according to BMW's annual reports:

Motorsports

BMW WTCC works driver Andy Priaulx won the 2006 and 2007 World Touring Car Championships in the 320si E90, and four other drivers achieved over 35 wins in the championship.

The E90 320si was used by several teams in the British Touring Car Championship (BTCC). The 2009 BTCC Drivers Championship was won by Colin Turkington using the E90 320si.

The E92 Art Car entered the 2010 24 Hours of Le Mans race, with Andy Priaulx (GB), Dirk Müller (DE) and Dirk Werner (DE) driving the number 79 car which failed to complete the race.

Awards
BBC's Top Gear Awards named the E90 as the "Ugliest Car of the Year 2005", describing it as "just 14 foot of car".
In April 2006, the E90 was awarded the World Car of the Year title. The car was praised for its balance between performance and practicality, as well as between style and seriousness. The jury also praised the new diesel engines and the all-wheel-drive variants.
Car and Driver magazine listed the E90 on their Ten Best list eight consecutive times between 2006 and 2013.
 The E90 was named "Best New Sports Sedan" in the 2006 Canadian Car of the Year awards.
 It was Japan's Import Car of the Year for 2005–06.
 The British motoring magazine What Car? awarded it Car of the Year 2006. From 2006 to 2011, they also awarded it Compact Executive of the Year.
In April 2011, the E90 335d saloon won the 2011 Diesel Car of the Year award, an honour bestowed by The Diesel Driver magazine's readers, receiving 29,6% of the vote.
 The British motoring magazine What Car? awarded the BMW 320d EfficientDynamics Auto the Overall Winner Green Car of the Year 2012. The 320d model has a UK combined fuel economy of 56 mpg and  emissions of 110g/km.

References 

3 Series
E90
Euro NCAP large family cars
Coupés
Sedans
Station wagons
Hardtop convertibles
Partial zero-emissions vehicles
Cars introduced in 2005
2010s cars
Touring cars

sv:BMW 3-serie#E90